Three Little Pigskins is a 1934 short subject directed by Raymond McCarey and starring American slapstick comedy team The Three Stooges (Moe Howard, Larry Fine and Jerry Howard). It is the fourth entry in the series released by Columbia Pictures starring the comedians, who released 190 short films for the studio between 1934 and 1959.

Plot
The Stooges are "recruited" by a college to drum up publicity for the college's football team by being dressed up as football players. Meanwhile, the owner of a professional football team, Joe Stacks, has to find three new players for the next game. One of Joe's girlfriends soon meets the Stooges and confuses them for genuine college football players known as "The Three Horsemen" (a parody of the "Four Horsemen" of Notre Dame fame). The Stooges go back to her house and meet the girl's two friends.

After squirting each other with seltzer bottles, everyone decides to play the game Blind man's buff. The Stooges are blindfolded and walk around trying to find the girls. Just at that moment, Joe and his two henchmen walk in. They punch out the trio and then chase them around the house. One of the women finally explains that the three strangers are actually "The Three Famous Horsemen," and Joe offers them money to play for him.

Naturally, the trio have not a clue how to play football. Their first game (staged at Hollywood's Gilmore Stadium) turns into a fiasco and eventually causing their team to lose. Believing that they had thrown the game on purpose instead, Stacks and his fellow managers turn their revolvers on the Stooges, hitting them on the buttocks as they attempt to flee.

Cast

Credited

Production notes
Three Little Pigskins was filmed on October 25–30, 1934. The film's title is a multiple pun, derived from The Three Little Pigs, along with "pigskin" being a synonym for a football. The film marked one of the earliest credited appearances for a then platinum blonde-haired Lucille Ball, who played a supporting role as one of the female recruiters and would herself become known for her own work in physical comedy in later years. Later in her career, when this short was brought up, Ball (apparently referring to the seltzer squirting scene) would remark, "The only thing I learned from The Three Stooges was how to duck. I still got wet!"

This is the first of several Stooge shorts involving a dumbwaiter, usually involving Curly accidentally destroying the floor of the elevator, causing injury to Larry and Moe. The dumbwaiter would reappear in Nutty But Nice. This is also the first of sixteen Stooge shorts using the word "three" in the title.

The football teams listed on the scoreboard are actually two baseball teams in real life, those names belonging to the Detroit Tigers and the Chicago Cubs.

For the football game, Moe's jersey number is H2O2, Larry's is 1/2, and Curly's is a "?".

The football team the Stooges played against was that of Loyola Marymount University.

There was no attempt to hide the venue, Gilmore Stadium, as its name on the scoreboard appears in several shots. There is also a shot that includes a billboard for Gilmore Oil, including its trademark symbol, a lion.

A planned concluding scene had the Stooges, years later, telling the story to their sons. It is unknown if this scene was ever filmed, but publicity photos exist of the Stooges, each with a young actor, all made up and dressed to resemble their older counterparts.

"...a Humdinger of Bangs and Bruises"

Moe Howard once called Three Little Pigskins "a humdinger of bangs and bruises," as it marked the first time the Stooges flatly refused to perform a stunt. In the film, during the game the boys are stopped by photographers on the sideline to pose for a picture, when the football players then tackle them. The team consisted of genuine college football players, and the Stooges — with their small stature — were afraid of being hurt. Larry Fine, the smallest and lightest of the three, told director Raymond McCarey, "Look, we can't do this scene. We're not stuntmen and if one of those gorillas falls on us, we'll never be able to finish the picture. We've never used stunt doubles before but we certainly need them now." The fact that both Curly and Larry had been hurt a few days earlier filming Three Little Pigskins (Curly broke his leg riding down the dumbwaiter and Larry lost a tooth due to a mistimed punch) reinforced the trio's decision to opt out of the scene.

McCarey assured the Stooges that it was safe, saying "Listen, fellows, you know how to take falls. You've done enough of them. It'll take hours to find doubles for you. Besides, we can't afford them. Don't worry, you won't get hurt." Moe Howard dryly agreed with McCarey, saying, "You're darn right we won't get hurt. We're not doing the scene."

Less than an hour after the exchange, the studio found three stunt doubles made up to look like the Stooges. McCarey yelled "Action" and chaos ensued. Two of the doubles were seriously injured with broken limbs, as were both photographers. The only stuntman not hurt was the one doubling for Curly Howard because of the padding that he wore to resemble the rotund Stooge. Moe Howard later said in his autobiography that "McCarey was speechless and sat in his director's chair with his head in his hands."

References

External links
 
 
Three Little Pigskins at threestooges.net

1934 films
The Three Stooges films
American black-and-white films
American football films
1934 comedy films
Films directed by Ray McCarey
Columbia Pictures short films
Films with screenplays by Felix Adler (screenwriter)
American slapstick comedy films
1930s English-language films
1930s American films